Brian Beacock is an American film, television and voice actor in English-dubbed anime and video games.

He is best known for playing Byonko in Zatch Bell, Takato Matsuki in Digimon Tamers, Yumichika Ayasegawa from Bleach, Yamato Delgado in Battle B-Daman, and Monokuma, the antagonist of the Danganronpa anime/video game franchise.

Filmography

Anime
Battle B-Daman – Yamato Delgado, Joshua
Beastars - Dom
Bleach – Yumichika Ayasegawa
Blood Lad – Shamkid
Blue Dragon – Andropov
Blue Exorcist – Renzo Shima
Bobobo-bo Bo-bobo – Dengaku Man, Additional Voices (credited as Donn A. Nordean)
Boruto: Naruto Next Generations - Chojuro
Bungo Stray Dogs – Ryūnosuke Akutagawa
Code Geass – Rivalz Cardemonde
Digimon Tamers – Takato Matsuki, Gallantmon Gallantmon Crimson Mode(shared with Steve Blum)
Digimon Frontier – Narrator (Replaced the Original Melissa Fahn Episode 43-50)/Bokomon
Digimon Fusion – Gravimon
Digimon Data Squad – Agumon/GeoGreymon/RizeGreymon/ShineGreymon
Doraemon – Sneech (Suneo Honekawa)
Dragon Ball Super – Krillin (Bang Zoom! Dub)
Durarara!! – Walker Yumasaki
Duel Masters – Aizen, Boy George (Season 3)
Idaten Jump – Arthur, Kiyoshi (of the Four Kings), Jero, Seiji
JoJo's Bizarre Adventure: Diamond is Unbreakable – Shigekiyo "Shigechi" Yangu
Kuroko's Basketball - Shōichi Imayoshi
Mix Master: Final Force –  Ninom, Blue Fox (credited as Donn A. Nordean)
Naruto – Yashamaru, Sakon and Ukon, White Zetsu, Additional Voices
Naruto: Shippuden – Chōjūrō, Yashamaru, Sakon and Ukon
Nura: Rise of the Yokai Clan series – Jiro Shima, Satori (credited as Donn A. Nordean)
One-Punch Man - Geryuganshoop
Sailor Moon R – Seijuuro Ginga/Ail (Viz Media dub)
Sword Art Online: Alicization - Takeru Higa
Tenkai Knights – Mr. White, Mr. Black (Ep. 42)
Toradora! – Kouji Haruta
Vivy: Fluorite Eye's Song – M
Zatch Bell! – Byonko, Jobin, Additional Voices

Video games
Bleach: Shattered Blade – Yumichika Ayasegawa
Bleach: The 3rd Phantom – Yumichika Ayasegawa, D-Roy Linker (credited as Donn A Nordean)
Danganronpa: Trigger Happy Havoc – Monokuma
Danganronpa 2: Goodbye Despair – Monokuma
Danganronpa Another Episode: Ultra Despair Girls – Monokuma
Danganronpa V3: Killing Harmony – Monokuma, Monosuke
Digimon World Data Squad – Agumon/GeoGreymon, RiseGreymon
Elsword – Raven
Fire Emblem Heroes – Luthier
Naruto: Ninja Council 3 – Sakon
Naruto: Ultimate Ninja 3 – Sakon and Ukon
Seven Samurai 20XX – Tay
Xenoblade Chronicles X – Additional voices
Zatch Bell! Mamodo Fury – Byonko

Television
Based on an Untrue Story (1993) – Television movie; Reporter #2
Late Night with Conan O'Brien (2000) – Axl in 'White Trash Wins Lotto'
Gary & Mike (2001) – Nafe; episode: "Road Rage"
Gormiti (2008) – Nick Tripp
The Rerun Show (2002) – 6 episodes
Passions (2005) – Store clerk; 2 episodes
CSI: Crime Scene Investigation (2004) – Irv; episode: "Ch-Ch-Changes"
Playing It Straight (2004) – Troubadour; 6 episodes

Film
American Slices (2000) – Short movie; Gabriel
Globehunters: An Around the World in 80 Days Adventure (2000) - Trevor (voice)
Circuit (2001) – Suspect/Drag Queen
Mulholland Drive (2001) – Studio Singer
Buying The Cow (2002) – Alex
Digimon Tamers: Battle of Adventurers - Takato Matsuda (voice)
Digimon Tamers: Runaway Locomon - Takato Matsuda (voice)
Digimon Frontier: Island of Lost Digimon - Bokomon (voice)
Paprika (2006) – Kei Himuro and Kuga
Blue Exorcist: The Movie (2012) – Renzo Shima (voice)
Monster Hunter: Legends of the Guild (2021) – as Navid (voice)
Sailor Moon Eternal (2021) – Helios/Pegasus

Other
AficionadosChris (YouTube) – Takato Matsuki

Awards and honors
Brian shared the 2005 RTS Television Award with Jamie Forsyth for Best Music – Original Title Music for "Playing It Straight". At the 2014 National Academy of Video Game Trade Reviewers (NAVGTR) awards, Beacock was nominated for Performance in a Comedy, Supporting for his work on Danganronpa: Trigger Happy Havoc.

References

External links
 
 
 

Living people
American male television actors
American male video game actors
American male voice actors
20th-century American male actors
21st-century American male actors
Year of birth missing (living people)